Grantham was a Parliamentary constituency in Lincolnshire, England.

The constituency was created in 1468 as a parliamentary borough which elected two Members of Parliament (MPs) to the House of Commons of the Parliament of England until the union with Scotland, and then to the Parliament of Great Britain until the Act of Union 1800 established the Parliament of the United Kingdom.

The parliamentary borough had its representation reduced to one MP in 1885, and was finally abolished in 1918, the name transferring to a new county division which elected one MP. The county constituency was abolished for the 1997 election, and the area formerly covered by this constituency is now mostly in Sleaford and North Hykeham. Grantham became part of the new constituency of Grantham and Stamford.

Boundaries 
The constituency was based on Grantham, a market town on the River Witham.

Members of Parliament

MPs 1468–1640

MPs 1640–1885

MPs 1885–1997

Elections

Elections in the 1830s

Elections in the 1840s

Elections in the 1850s

Elections in the 1860s

 
 
 

Welby resigned in order to contest the 1868 by-election in South Lincolnshire, causing a by-election.

Elections in the 1870s

Elections in the 1880s 

 

Mellor was appointed Judge Advocate General of the Armed Forces, requiring a by-election.

Elections in the 1890s

Elections in the 1900s

Elections in the 1910s 

General Election 1914–15:

Another General Election was required to take place before the end of 1915. The political parties had been making preparations for an election to take place and by July 1914, the following candidates had been selected; 
Liberal: Ernest Bennett
Unionist: Herbert Guy Snowden

Elections in the 1920s

Elections in the 1930s 

General Election 1939–40:

Another General Election was required to take place before the end of 1940. The political parties had been making preparations for an election to take place and by the Autumn of 1939, the following candidates had been selected; 
Conservative: Victor Warrender
Labour: Montague William Moore

Elections in the 1940s

Elections in the 1950s

Elections in the 1960s

Elections in the 1970s

Elections in the 1980s

Elections in the 1990s

See also
List of parliamentary constituencies in Lincolnshire

Notes and references 
Craig, F. W. S. (1983). British parliamentary election results 1918–1949 (3 ed.). Chichester: Parliamentary Research Services. .

Sources 
 D Brunton & D H Pennington, Members of the Long Parliament (London: George Allen & Unwin, 1954)
 Cobbett's Parliamentary history of England, from the Norman Conquest in 1066 to the year 1803 (London: Thomas Hansard, 1808) 
 J E Neale, The Elizabethan House of Commons (London: Jonathan Cape, 1949)

Politics of Grantham
Parliamentary constituencies in Lincolnshire (historic)
1468 establishments in England
Constituencies of the Parliament of the United Kingdom disestablished in 1997
South Kesteven District